Vladimir Vladimirovich Zavyalov (born 1 May 1974) is a  Kazakhstani retired ice hockey player. During his career he played for several teams in Kazakhstan, Russia, and Belarus. Zavyalov also played for the Kazakhstani national team at the 1998 Winter Olympic Games and multiple World Championships.

Career statistics

Regular season and playoffs

RUS.3 totals do not include numbers from the 1993–94 season.

International

References

External links

1974 births
Living people
Barys Nur-Sultan players
HC CSKA Moscow players
HC Dinamo Minsk players
HC Neftekhimik Nizhnekamsk players
HC Sibir Novosibirsk players
HC Vityaz players
HK Vitebsk players
Ice hockey players at the 1998 Winter Olympics
Kazakhstani ice hockey centres
Kazzinc-Torpedo players
Krylya Sovetov Moscow players
Metallurg Novokuznetsk players
Olympic ice hockey players of Kazakhstan
Rubin Tyumen players
Saryarka Karagandy players
Severstal Cherepovets players
Sportspeople from Oskemen
Yunost Minsk players
Asian Games gold medalists for Kazakhstan
Medalists at the 1996 Asian Winter Games
Asian Games medalists in ice hockey
Ice hockey players at the 1996 Asian Winter Games